Gerhard Henrik Armauer Hansen (29 July 1841 – 12 February 1912) was a Norwegian physician, remembered for his identification of the bacterium Mycobacterium leprae in 1873 as the causative agent of leprosy. His distinguished work was recognized at the International Leprosy Congress held at Bergen in 1909.

Life 
Hansen was born in Bergen, Norway, and attended the Bergen Cathedral School. He worked at Rikshospitalet in Christiania (now Oslo) and as a doctor in Lofoten. In 1868 Hansen returned to Bergen to study leprosy while working at Lungegård Hospital (Lungegårdshospitalet) with Daniel Cornelius Danielssen, a noted expert.

Leprosy was regarded as largely hereditary or otherwise miasmic in origin. Hansen concluded on the basis of epidemiological studies that leprosy was a specific disease with a specific cause. In 1870–71 Hansen travelled to Bonn and Vienna to gain the training necessary for him to prove his hypothesis. In 1873, he announced the discovery of Mycobacterium leprae in the tissues of all sufferers, although he did not identify them as bacteria, and received little support. The discovery was made with a "new and better" microscope.

In 1879 Hansen gave tissue samples to Albert Neisser, who then successfully stained the bacteria and announced his findings in 1880, claiming to have discovered the disease-causing organism. There was some dispute between Neisser and Hansen, Hansen as discoverer of the bacillus and Neisser as identifier of it as the etiological agent. Neisser tried to downplay the assistance of Hansen. Hansen's claim was weakened by his failure to produce a pure microbiological culture in an artificial medium, or to prove that the rod-shaped organisms were infectious. Further Hansen had attempted to infect at least one female patient without consent and although no damage was caused, that case ended in court and Hansen lost his post at the hospital.

Hansen remained medical officer for leprosy in Norway and it was through his efforts that the leprosy acts of 1877 and 1885 were passed, leading to a steady decline of the disease in Norway from 1,800 known cases in 1875 to just 575 cases in 1901.

Hansen had suffered from syphilis since the 1860s but died of heart disease. He was an atheist.

Women's rights
He was a co-founder and a board member of the Bergen chapter of the Norwegian Association for Women's Rights, led by his sister, prominent women's rights advocate Amalie Hansen.

Honors
 Leprosy Museum (Lepramuseet) at St. Jørgen Hospital in Bergen has been dedicated to Hansen.
 Haukeland University Hospital has established Armauer Hansens hus as a research facility operated by the University of Bergen.
 In Jerusalem, a 19th-century leprosarium has borne Hansen's name since 1950. It has been reconstructed into an art center while preserving the physician's surname in its title.
Armauer Hansen Research Institute (AHRI) in Addis Ababa, Ethiopia under the ministry of Health is named after Hansen. AHRI is a Biomedical research Institute in Ethiopia working in tuberculosis, HIV, malaria, leishmaniasis training, and research.https://ahri.gov.et/

References

External links
 

1841 births
1912 deaths
Physicians from Bergen
People educated at the Bergen Cathedral School
University of Oslo alumni
Norwegian atheists
Norwegian medical researchers
Norwegian leprologists
Norwegian public health doctors
Recipients of the St. Olav's Medal
Norwegian Association for Women's Rights people